Ibiza (natively and officially in , see below) is a Spanish island in the Mediterranean Sea off the eastern coast of the Iberian Peninsula. It is the third largest of the Balearic Islands, in Spain. Its largest settlements are Ibiza Town (or simply ), Santa Eulària des Riu, and Sant Antoni de Portmany.

Ibiza is well known for its nightlife and electronic dance music club scene in  the summer, which attract large numbers of tourists. The island's government and the Spanish Tourist Office have worked toward promoting more family-oriented tourism.

Ibiza is a UNESCO World Heritage Site. Ibiza and the nearby island of Formentera to its south are called the Pine Islands, or "Pityuses".

Names
The official, Catalan name is Eivissa. Its name in Spanish is Ibiza. In British English, the name is usually pronounced in an approximation of the Peninsular Spanish variant, whereas in American English the pronunciation is closer to the Latin American Spanish variant (and so forth).

Phoenician colonists called the island Ibossim or Iboshim ("Dedicated to Bes"). It was later known to Romans as Ebusus. The Greeks called the two islands of Ibiza and Formentera the Pityoûssai ("Pine-Covered Islands"). The Catalan name  and the Spanish name  retain this Greek root.

In the 18th and 19th centuries the island was known to the British and especially to the Royal Navy as Ivica.

History

In 654 BC, Phoenician settlers founded a port on Ibiza. With the decline of Phoenicia after the Assyrian invasions, Ibiza came under the control of Carthage, also a former Phoenician colony. The island produced dye, salt, fish sauce (garum) and wool.

A shrine with offerings to the goddess Tanit was established in the cave at Es Cuieram, and the rest of the Balearic Islands entered Eivissa's commercial orbit after 400 BC. Ibiza was a major trading post along the Mediterranean routes. Ibiza began establishing its own trading stations along the nearby Balearic island of Majorca, such as Na Guardis, and "Na Galera" where numerous Balearic mercenaries hired on, no doubt as slingers, to fight for Carthage.

During the Second Punic War, the island was assaulted by the two Scipio brothers (Publius and Gnaeus) in 217 BC but remained loyal to Carthage. With the Carthaginian military failing on the Iberian mainland, Ibiza was last used, 205 B.C, by the fleeing Carthaginian general Mago to gather supplies and men before sailing to Menorca and then to Liguria. Ibiza negotiated a favorable treaty (Foedus) with the Romans, which spared Ibiza from further destruction and allowed it to continue its Carthaginian-Punic institutions, traditions and even coinage well into the Empire days, when it became an official Roman municipality.

After the fall of the Western Roman Empire and a brief period of first Vandal and then Byzantine rule, the island was conquered by the Muslims in 902, the few remaining locals converted to Islam and Berber settlers came in. Under Islamic rule, Ibiza (Yabisah) came in close contact with the city of Dénia—the closest port in the nearby Iberian peninsula, located in the Valencian Community—and the two areas were administered jointly by the Taifa of Dénia during some time (11th century).

Ibiza, together with the islands of Formentera and Menorca, were invaded by the Norwegian King Sigurd I of Norway in the spring of 1110 on his crusade to Jerusalem. The king had previously conquered the cities of Sintra, Lisbon and Alcácer do Sal and given them over to Christian rulers, in an effort to weaken the Muslim grip on the Iberian peninsula. King Sigurd continued to Sicily where he visited King Roger II of Sicily.

The island was conquered by Aragonese King James I in 1235. The local Muslim population got deported, as was the case with neighboring Majorca and elsewhere, and Christians arrived from Girona. The island maintained its own self-government in several forms until 1715, when King Philip V of Spain abolished the local government's autonomy. The arrival of democracy in the late 1970s led to the Statute of Autonomy of the Balearic Islands. Today, the island is part of the Balearic Autonomous Community, along with Majorca, Menorca and Formentera.

World Heritage Site
Though primarily known for its party scene, large portions of the island are registered as UNESCO World Heritage Sites. 

A notable example includes the Renaissance walls of the old town of Ibiza City, which were awarded UNESCO World Heritage Status in 1999. They are one of the world's few Renaissance walls that were not demolished, and part of the medieval wall is still visible. There are some Ibizan cultural sites, such as the remains of the first Phoenician settlement at Sa Caleta. Other sites are still under threat from the developers, such as Ses Feixes Wetlands, but this site has now been recognised as a threatened environment, and it is expected that steps will be taken to preserve this wetland. The oceanic plant Posidonia oceanica is also part of UNESCO's World Heritage.

Geography

Ibiza is the larger of a group of the western Balearic archipelago called the Pityusic Islands (Pitiusas) or "Pine Islands" composed of itself and Formentera. The Balearic island chain includes over 50 islands, many of which are uninhabited.

Administration
Ibiza is administratively part of the autonomous community of the Balearic Islands, whose capital is Palma, on the island of Majorca. Ibiza comprises five of the region's 67 municipalities:

Prior to its split in 2007, Formentera was part of the council.

Climate

Ibiza has a hot semi-arid climate (Köppen: BSh), bordering on a hot-summer Mediterranean climate (Csa). Ibiza lies at the same latitude as Atlantic City, yet it is much warmer for its location in the Mediterranean Basin. The climate of Ibiza is typically warm, sunny and dry, with low variation between highs and lows. Winters are slightly rainy and mild, from November to April normally the whole island turns green for the seasonal rains. Summers are hot and fairly humid, but with very little rainfall. The few rainy days are often accompanied by thunderstorms. Extreme temperatures are rare for the influence of the sea.

People
Demographically, Ibiza displays a very peculiar configuration, as census agencies diverge on exact figures. According to the 2001 national census, Ibiza had 88,076 inhabitants (against 76,000 in 1991, 64,000 in 1981, 45,000 in 1971, and 38,000 in 1961). However, by the 2011 national census, this had grown to 133,594, and by the start of 2019 had reached 147,914. This rapid growth stems from the amnesty which incorporated a number of unregistered foreign migrants. In terms of origin, about 55 percent of island residents were born in Ibiza, 35 percent are domestic migrants from mainland Spain (mostly working-class families from Andalusia, and the remainder from Catalonia, Valencia and Castile), and the remaining 10 to 15 per cent are foreign, dual and multi-national citizens of the EU and abroad (Govern de les Illes Balears – IBAE 1996). In decreasing order, the most commonly visiting foreigners are German, British, Latin American, French, Italian and Dutch.

The Spanish composer and music theorist Miguel Roig-Francolí was born in Ibiza, as was the politician and Spain's former Minister of Foreign Affairs, Abel Matutes. Notable former residents of Ibiza include: Spandau Ballet's Steve Norman, English punk musician John Simon Ritchie (Sid Vicious), comic actor Terry-Thomas, Hungarian master forger Elmyr de Hory, American authors Cormac McCarthy and Clifford Irving.

Language
Eivissenc is the native dialect of Catalan that is spoken on Ibiza and nearby Formentera. Catalan shares co-official status with Spanish. Additionally, because of the influence of tourism and expatriates living in or maintaining residences on the island, other languages, like English, French, German and Italian, are widely spoken.

Tourism

Nightlife

Ibiza is considered to be a popular tourist destination, especially due to its well-known and at times riotous nightclub-based nightlife centred on two areas: Ibiza Town, the island's capital on the southern shore and Sant Antoni to the west. Ibiza has garnered the reputation as the "Party Capital of the world".

Nightlife in Ibiza has undergone several changes since the island's opening to international tourism in the late 1950s. Origins of today's club culture may be traced back to hippie gatherings held during the 1960s and 1970s. During these, people of various nationalities sharing the hippie ethos would regroup, talk, play music and occasionally take recreational drugs. These would most often happen on beaches during the day, with nude bathing a common sight, and in rented country estates in the evenings or at nights. Apart from this confidential scene, which nevertheless attracted many foreigners to the island, local venues during the 1960s consisted mostly of bars, which would be the meeting points for Ibicencos, ex-pats, seafarers and tourists. The Estrella bar on the port and La Tierra in the old city of Eivissa were favourites.

During the 1970s, a decade that saw the emergence of the contemporary nightclub, several places opened and made a lasting impact on Ibiza's nightlife. Four of these original clubs are still in operation today: Pacha, Privilege (formerly Ku), Amnesia and Es Paradís. These four clubs mainly defined nightlife on the White Island, which has evolved and developed from several distinctive elements: open-air parties (Es Paradis, Privilege, Amnesia), held in isolated places, eventually old fincas (Pacha, Amnesia), that mixed in nudity and costume party (Es Paradis, Privilege, Pacha) and enabled people from various backgrounds to blend (all). The hippie ethos served as a common factor that infused all these venues and catalyzed the experience of a certain kind of freedom, accentuated by the holiday nature of most of the stays on the White Island.

During the 1980s, the music played in these clubs gained in reputation and became known as Balearic beat, a precursor of the British acid house scene. As rave parties blossomed all over Europe, a DJ-driven club culture took hold of Ibizenca nightlife. It was at that time that Space opened, thanks to Pepe Rosello, which found a niche in the after-hour parties. The club would close at 06:00 and open again at 07:00, when all the other clubs were still closed, enabling party-goers to flock from the other clubs to Space and continue dancing in broad daylight.

At the end of the 1990s, the after-hour parties took firm root on the island. In 1999, the Circoloco parties made their debut at DC10, with some of the original elements of Ibiza nightlife at the forefront.

In recent years, during the summer, top producers and DJs in dance music come to the island and play at the various clubs, in between touring to other international destinations. Some of the most famous DJs run their own weekly nights around the island. Many of these DJs use Ibiza as an outlet for presenting new songs within the house, trance and techno genres of electronic dance music.  The island has achieved fame as a cultural centre for house and trance in particular, with its name often being used as a partial metonym for the particular flavour of electronic music originating there, much like Goa in India.

Since 2005, the live music event Ibiza Rocks has changed perceptions of the Ibiza party landscape. Bands such as Arctic Monkeys, Kasabian, The Prodigy and the Kaiser Chiefs have played in the courtyard of the Ibiza Rocks Hotel.

The season traditionally begins at the end of May, where Opening Parties take place at Ibiza's clubs over the course of a three-week period. Opening Parties normally coincide with the culmination of the International Music Summit, a three-day conference which has taken place on the island every year since 2008. The first clubs that host opening parties are normally Amnesia, Privilege, Ushuaia and Hi Ibiza.

Other 
The island's government is in the process of making policy changes to encourage a more family-friendly and quieter tourism scene. These include rules such as the closing of all nightclubs by 06:00 at the latest and requiring all new hotels to be 5-star. The administration wants to attract a more international mixture of tourists.

The tourism of the island is not always characterized by its nightlife. Visitors can take a hot-air balloon ride, surf, visit the Cave Can Mark, or go to Cap Blanc's Aquarium.

In popular culture
A number of novels and other books have been written using Ibiza as the setting, including "The White Island" by Stephen Armstrong, Joshua Then and Now by Mordecai Richler, Soma Blues by Robert Sheckley, Vacation in Ibiza by Lawrence Schimel, A Short Life on a Sunny Isle: An Alphonse Dantan Mystery by Hannah Blank, They Are Ruining Ibiza by A. C. Greene, and The Python Project by Victor Canning. Books including Ibiza Bohemia, which was published by Assouline, which have explored the island itself with both photography and text, while other such as Memes Eivissencs have registered the traditions of their residents and their history in social media.

The third track on Prefab Sprout's 1990 album Jordan: The Comeback is Machine Gun Ibiza.

In Monty Python's Flying Circus, the opening sketch of Episode 33 features the pilot Biggles.  His secretary teasingly calls him "Señor Biggles," and Biggles protests, saying, "I've never even been to Spain." The secretary responds, "	You went to Ibiza last year." Biggles counters, "That's still not grounds for calling me señor, or Don Beeg-les for that matter."

Vengaboys' 1999 single "We're Going to Ibiza" reached number one on the singles chart in United Kingdom and the Netherlands.

The island is shown as the home of notorious art forger Elmyr de Hory in the 1973 docudrama F for Fake by Orson Welles.

In popular music, American singer-songwriter Mike Posner released "I Took a Pill in Ibiza" (alternatively known as "In Ibiza", or its clean title "I Took a Plane to Ibiza") in April 2015, as single on his Vevo account and in the exclusive The Truth EP; it was later released on At Night, Alone in May 2016. Originally an acoustic guitar-based folk pop song, it was remixed by the Norwegian duo SeeB as a tropical house dance pop song, and released digitally as a single in the United States on 24 July 2015. "I Took a Pill in Ibiza" peaked at #4 on the Billboard Hot 100 in the U.S., and reached #1 on seventeen other charts. Tourism officials in Ibiza were reportedly "annoyed" by the song's apparent reinforcement of drug culture associated with Ibiza in the past, and Tourism Director Vicent Ferrer subsequently invited Posner to witness the island's culture and how it contrasts with the party "typecast".

Development
Since the early days of mass tourism on the island, there have been a large number of development projects ranging from successful ventures, such as the super clubs at Space and Privilege, to failed development projects, such as Josep Lluís Sert's abandoned hotel complex at Cala D'en Serra, the half-completed and now demolished "Idea" nightclub in Sant Antoni, and the ruins of a huge restaurant/nightclub in the hills near Sant Josep called "Festival Club" that only operated for three summer seasons in the early 1970s. The transient nature of club-oriented tourism is most obvious in these ruins scattered all over the island. Local artist Irene de Andrès has tackled the difficult issue of the impact of mass tourism on the island local landscapes, both natural and cultural, in an ongoing project called "Donde nada ocurre" (Where nothing happens). In 2013, Ibiza property prices generally remained above market value, and many of the development projects on the island have now been completed or continue, as well as some new projects announced at the end of 2012. Since 2009, Ibiza has received an increase in the number of tourists every year, with nearly 6 million people travelling through Ibiza Airport in 2012. The summer season has become concentrated between June and September, focusing on the "clubbing calendar" which is currently booming. In recent years, the luxury market has dramatically improved, with new restaurants, clubs, and improvements to the marina in Ibiza Town.

Ibiza's increased popularity has led to problems with potable water shortages and overrun infrastructure. This has led to the imposition of a "Sustainable Tourism Tax" which went into effect on 1 July 2016. Minister of Tourism Vincente Torres stated in an interview in 2016 that the government has instituted a moratorium on building in certain areas. He said that with almost 100,000 legal tourist beds and about 132,000 inhabitants on the island's  not much more tourism can be supported.

Transport

Ibiza has its own airport, which has many international flights during the summer tourist season, especially from the European Union.

There are also ferries from the harbour of Sant Antoni and Ibiza Town to Barcelona, Majorca, Dénia, and Valencia. There are also ferries to Formentera leaving Sant Antoni Harbour (normally every Wednesday), and daily from Ibiza Town, Santa Eulària, and Figueretes–Platja d'en Bossa.

Several public buses also travel between Sant Antoni and Ibiza Town, every 15 minutes in summer and every half-hour in winter. In addition, there are buses from Sant Antoni to Cala Bassa, Cala Conta and Cala Tarida, and to the airport. From Ibiza there are buses to the Platja d'en Bossa, Ses Salines, the airport and Santa Eulària.

Gallery

Explanatory notes

References

Citations

General bibliography 
 .

External links 

 Consell Insular d'Eivissa (local government) 
 Official tourism portal of Ibiza – Consell Insular d'Eivissa

 
Cultural landscapes
Islands of the Balearic Islands
Mediterranean port cities and towns in Spain
Phoenician colonies in Spain
Tourist attractions in Spain
World Heritage Sites in Spain
Mediterranean islands